Philippe Bianconi (born 27 March 1960) is a French pianist.

Career
Born in Nice, France, Bianconi studied at the Conservatoire de Nice with Simone Delbert-Février and later in Paris with Gaby Casadesus and in Freiburg Vitalij Margulis. At the age of 17, he won first prize at the Jeunesses musicales competition in Belgrade; he went on to win first prize at the Cleveland International Piano Competition and the Silver Medal in the 1985 Van Cliburn Competition.

Since his debut at Carnegie Hall in 1987 he has performed in major concert halls and festivals around the world. Apart from solo recitals and chamber music, he has performed with many leading orchestras and conductors. The Washington Post has described him as an artist whose playing is "always close to the soul of the music, filling the space with poetry and life". He has been appointed as the director of The Conservatoire Américain de Fontainebleau in September 2014.

Recordings 
Frédéric Chopin. 4 Ballades. 1 CD, La Dolce Volta (2014)
Claude Debussy. Préludes. 2 CD, La Dolce volta (2012)
Claude Debussy. Estampes, Images, Masques, L'Isle Joyeuse, ... D'Un Cahier D'Esquisses. SACD (2011)
Robert Schumann. The Lyrinx Recordings. 2 CD (2011, re-publication of the 1996 and 1998 recordings)
Ernest Chausson. Concert op.21 u.a. Werke. Mit R. Pasquier (Violine), S. Piau (Sopran) and the Parisii Quartet. Saphir (2010)
Maurice Ravel. L'œuvre pour piano seul. 2 SACD. Lyrinx (2007)
Johannes Brahms. The Violin Sonatas. With Tedi Papavrami (Violin). æon (2007)
Franz Schubert. Sonata D. 959, 3 Klavierstücke D. 946. Lyrinx (2001)
Robert Schumann. Fantasie in C, Davidsbündlertänze. Lyrinx (1998)
Robert Schumann. Etudes symphoniques, Variations posthumes, Humoreske. Lyrinx (1996)
Maurice Ravel. Miroirs, Valses Nobles et sentimentales, Gaspard de la Nuit. Lyrinx (1993)
Gabriel Fauré. La Bonne Chanson. With the Parisii Quartet, J. Correas (Bariton), D. Desjardins (dble. bass). Pierre Verany label (2005)
Johannes Brahms. Piano Quintet op.34. With the Sine Nomine Quartet. Claves
Schostakovitch. Sonata op.40 in d, Prokofiev, Sonata op.119 in C. With Gary Hoffman (Cello). Le Chant du Monde (1999)
Camille Saint-Saëns. Piano Concerto n.2 in g. With the Budapest Philharmonic Orchestra/Rico Saccani (2003)
Franz Schubert. Winterreise D.911. With Hermann Prey (baritone). Denon (1984)
Franz Schubert. Die schöne Müllerin. With Hermann Prey (baritone). Denon (1985)
Franz Schubert. Schwanengesang. With Hermann Prey (baritone). Denon (1985)
The Seventh Cliburn Competition, 1985. Prokofiev, Ravel, Liszt. VAIA (1998)

References

External links
Biography on the website of Barrett Vantage Artists
Philippe Bianconi on YouTube
Portrait on the site of Piano bleu (in French)
Portrait in German
fontainebleauschools.org

1960 births
20th-century French male classical pianists
21st-century French male classical pianists
Cleveland International Piano Competition prize-winners
Living people
People from Nice
Prize-winners of the Van Cliburn International Piano Competition